Holocarboxylase synthetase (biotin—(propionyl-Coenzyme A-carboxylase (ATP-hydrolysing)) ligase)), also known as protein—biotin ligase, is a family of enzymes ({). This enzyme is important for the effective use of biotin, a B vitamin found in foods such as liver, egg yolks, and milk. In many of the body's tissues, holocarboxylase synthetase activates other specific enzymes (called biotin-dependent carboxylases) by attaching biotin to them. These carboxylases are involved in many critical cellular functions, including the production and breakdown of proteins, fats, and carbohydrates.

The catalyzed reaction:

ATP + biotin + apo-propionyl-CoA:carbon-dioxide ligase (ADP-forming)  AMP + diphosphate + propionyl-CoA:carbon-dioxide ligase (ADP-forming)

The 3 substrates of this enzyme are ATP, biotin, and [[apo-[propionyl-CoA:carbon-dioxide ligase (ADP-forming)]], whereas its 3 products are AMP, diphosphate, and propionyl-CoA:carbon-dioxide ligase (ADP-forming).

Holocarboxylase synthetase may also play a role in regulating the activity of genes. In the nucleus, the enzyme likely attaches biotin molecules to histones, which are structural proteins that bind to DNA and give chromosomes their shape. Changing the shape of histones may help determine whether certain genes are turned on or off; however, it is not known how adding biotin affects gene regulation.

The HLCS gene is located on the long (q) arm of chromosome 21 at position 22.1, from base pair 37,045,059 to base pair 37,284,372.

Related conditions 
Holocarboxylase synthetase deficiency: About 30 mutations in the HLCS gene have been identified in people with holocarboxylase synthetase deficiency. Most of these mutations substitute one amino acid (a building block of proteins) for another amino acid in the holocarboxylase synthetase enzyme. Many of the known mutations occur in a region of the enzyme that binds to biotin. These mutations reduce the enzyme's ability to attach biotin to carboxylases and histones. Without biotin, carboxylases remain inactive and are unable to process proteins, fats, and carbohydrates. A lack of holocarboxylase synthetase activity may also alter the regulation of certain genes that are important for normal development. Researchers believe that these disruptions in important cellular functions lead to breathing problems, skin rashes, and the other characteristic signs and symptoms of holocarboxylase synthetase deficiency.

See also 
 Biotinylation

References

External links 
 

EC 6.3.4
Enzymes of unknown structure